Eucalyptus curtisii, commonly known as Plunkett mallee, is a species of mallee or small tree that is endemic to south-east Queensland in Australia. It has smooth grey to silvery bark, lance-shaped, narrow elliptic or curved adult leaves, flower buds in groups of seven, white flowers and wrinkled, cup-shaped fruit.

Description
It has smooth grey to silvery bark that is shed in short curly flakes. Adult leaves are lance-shaped, elliptic or curved, glossy green but much paler on the lower surface. The flower buds are arranged in groups of seven on a branching inflorescence near the ends of the stems, each branch with groups of seven buds. Flowering occurs from September to December and the flowers are white to creamy white.

Taxonomy and naming
The description was publish in Proceedings of the Royal Society of Queensland. The specific epithet (curtisii) honours Densil Curtis, a farmer and naturalist, who collected the type specimens in 1923 and 1929.

Distribution and habitat
Plunkett mallee grows in shrubland and open forest in poorly drained sites between Beenleigh, Inglewood, Dalby, and Theodore in south-east Queensland .

Cultural references
Eucalyptus curtisii was adopted by Ipswich City Council as its floral emblem in 1996.

See also
List of Eucalyptus species

References

Flora of Queensland
Trees of Australia
curtisii
Myrtales of Australia
Rare flora of Australia
Mallees (habit)
Plants described in 1931
Taxa named by William Blakely